Elections to the Volksraad were held in the Dutch East Indies in 1935.

Electoral system
The Volksraad had a total of 60 members, 38 of which were elected and 22 appointed. Seats were also assigned to ethnic groups, with 25 for the Dutch population (15 elected, 10 appointed), 30 for the native population (20 elected, 10 appointed) and five for the foreign Orientals (Chinese and Arab Indonesian) (3 elected, 2 appointed).

Candidates and parties
The candidates and parties could be divided into left, right and centrist groups:

Left group
Nationalists, led by R.M.A.A. Koesoemo Oetojo from Boedi Oetomo (among the representatives were Mohammad Husni Thamrin from the Betawi ethnic group and Oto Iskandar di Nata from Paguyuban Pasundan
Native Administrative Officials Union (among the representatives were Achmad Djajadiningrat, Wiranatakusumah V and Jahja Datoek Kajo)
Minahasan Union from Northern Celebes, represented by Sam Ratulangi
Javan Catholic Political Union led by Ignatius Joseph Kasimo Hendrowahyono
Chinese Indonesian Party
Centrist group
Christian Constitutional
Indies Catholic Party
Political Economic Union
Association of Civil Service Officers
Homeland Affairs representative
Regents Union
Right group
Indo Europeesch Verbond led by Dick de Hoog
Fatherland Club led by Feuilleteau de Bruyn
Chung Hwa Hui, Chinese Association led by Hok Hoei Kan and Loa Sek Hie
Arab representative (Sayyid Ismail bin Sayyid Abdoellah bin Alwi Alatas)
Entrepreneurs (plantation owners) representative
Independent native representatives, led by R. Sosrohadikoesoemo from Southern Celebes

Results

Members
Chairman: Mr. H.J. Spit.

First Deputy: R.M.A.A. Koesoemo Oetojo.

Second Deputy: F.H. de Hoog.

References

Dutch East
Dutch East Indies Volksraad elections
1935 in the Dutch East Indies
Election and referendum articles with incomplete results